Ueli Gegenschatz (January 3, 1971 – November 13, 2009, Zurich) was a Swiss BASE jumper, paraglider and skydiver who held several world records.

Ueli Gegenschatz was known for his expert paragliding, skydiving and BASE jumping and Wingsuit flying. He completed his first parachute jump in the military preliminary course for long-distance scouts in 1989. Although Gegenschatz did not become a scout, he remained true to jumping: in 1990 he flew with a paraglider for the first time and from then on, as an amateur, he was part of the extended world elite. 

From the mid-1990s onwards, he devoted himself more to jumping again, and in 1997 he made his first object jump from a 1000-metre high rock face in Norway. A member of the Swiss national paragliding team for four years, Gegenschatz co-founded the Red Bull acro team in 1995. Among his BASE jumping achievements, many of which are available as YouTube videos, were jumps off Eiffel Tower, the Petronas Towers in KL as well as jumps off of the Eiger, Mönch and Jungfrau peaks all in one day.

On November 11, 2009, during a jump for Red Bull from the Sunrise Tower in Zurich, Switzerland, a gust of wind hit Gegenschatz and he lost control of his jump. He hit the ground and was seriously injured. He died on November 13.

References

External links 
 
 

1971 births
2009 deaths
Swiss skydivers
Sport deaths in Switzerland
Parachuting deaths
Accidental deaths from falls
Filmed deaths from falls
Accidental deaths in Switzerland